Urgellet is a historical territory and a natural region of Catalonia. It is located in the Pyrenees exactly in the actual administrative comarca of Alt Urgell, that last includes Baridà, Urgellet and the banks of Oliana, Peramola and Bassella.

Geography
The mountainous territory of Urgellet is almost wholly part of the Alt Urgell, except for the eastern Baridà and the southern sector. The Mollet Gorge is the natural boundary between the Urgellet and Baridà.

The history of Urgellet is highly related to Sedes Urgelli (La Seu d'Urgell or city of Urgell), the Bishop of Urgell and the County of Urgell. In the latter case, the territory Urgellet was leading the county, with capital in la Seu d'Urgell, and extended southwards up to the comarques of Urgell and Pla d'Urgell, among others. For this reason some towns and two comarques in Lleida contain the name of Urgell that has its origin in the city of Urgell and Urgellet region.

Etymology
The name Urgell has a specifically Pyrenean pre-Roman origin. Linguist Joan Coromines interprets the meaning as related to the presence of water.

Municipalities inside Urgellet
Alàs i Cerc
Arsèguel
Cabó
Cava (el Querforadat town is inside the municipality of Cava but from Baridà region)
Coll de Nargó
Estamariu
Fígols i Alinyà
Josa i Tuixén
Montferrer i Castellbò
Organyà
Ribera d'Urgellet
La Seu d'Urgell
Les Valls d'Aguilar
Les Valls de Valira
La Vansa i Fórnols

References

Alt Urgell
Natural regions of Spain
Historical regions